is a Japanese badminton player affiliated with Marusugi Bluvic. She and her partner Sayaka Hirota won the 2017 Most Improved Player of the Year award. The duo were ranked as world No. 1 at the BWF World Ranking in 21 June 2018.

Achievements

BWF World Championships 
Women's doubles

Asian Games 
Women's doubles

Asian Championships 
Women's doubles

BWF World Tour (11 titles, 5 runners-up) 
The BWF World Tour, which was announced on 19 March 2017 and implemented in 2018, is a series of elite badminton tournaments sanctioned by the Badminton World Federation (BWF). The BWF World Tour is divided into levels of World Tour Finals, Super 1000, Super 750, Super 500, Super 300, and the BWF Tour Super 100.

Women's doubles

BWF Superseries (1 title, 1 runner-up) 
The BWF Superseries, which was launched on 14 December 2006 and implemented in 2007, was a series of elite badminton tournaments, sanctioned by the Badminton World Federation (BWF). BWF Superseries levels were Superseries and Superseries Premier. A season of Superseries consisted of twelve tournaments around the world that had been introduced since 2011. Successful players were invited to the Superseries Finals, which were held at the end of each year.

Women's doubles

  BWF Superseries Finals tournament
  BWF Superseries Premier tournament
  BWF Superseries tournament

BWF Grand Prix (4 titles, 1 runner-up) 
The BWF Grand Prix had two levels, the Grand Prix and Grand Prix Gold. It was a series of badminton tournaments sanctioned by the Badminton World Federation (BWF) and played between 2007 and 2017.

Women's doubles

  BWF Grand Prix Gold tournament
  BWF Grand Prix tournament

BWF International Challenge/Series (3 titles, 3 runners-up) 
Women's singles

Women's doubles

  BWF International Challenge tournament
  BWF International Series tournament

Performance timeline

National team 
 Senior level

Individual competitions 
 Senior level

Women's singles

Women's doubles

Mixed doubles

References

External links 
 

Living people
1993 births
Sportspeople from Kumamoto Prefecture
Japanese female badminton players
Badminton players at the 2020 Summer Olympics
Olympic badminton players of Japan
Badminton players at the 2018 Asian Games
Asian Games gold medalists for Japan
Asian Games bronze medalists for Japan
Asian Games medalists in badminton
Medalists at the 2018 Asian Games
World No. 1 badminton players
21st-century Japanese women